Ray Johnston (born 16 September 1945) is  a former Australian rules footballer who played with North Melbourne in the Victorian Football League (VFL).

Notes

External links 		
		
		
		
		
		
		
Living people		
1945 births		
		
Australian rules footballers from Victoria (Australia)		
North Melbourne Football Club players